Sulaiman Mohamed is a Qatari sports shooter. He competed in the men's 50 metre rifle, prone event at the 1984 Summer Olympics.

References

Year of birth missing (living people)
Living people
Qatari male sport shooters
Olympic shooters of Qatar
Shooters at the 1984 Summer Olympics
Place of birth missing (living people)